Three vessels bearing the name Regent or HMS Regent have served England or the Royal Navy:

 Grace Dieu (or Grace à Dieu), was a 600 or 1000 tons (bm) vessel launched at Chatham in 1488. She was renamed Regent the next year. In 1512, she was the flagship of English admiral Sir Thomas Knyvett. On 10 August 1512, she was destroyed during the Battle of St. Mathieu when Hervé de Portzmoguer, captain of Cordelière, sacrificed his vessel to sink Regent. The English were boarding Cordelière when her powder magazine blew up (some say it was deliberately ignited). Knyvett and Hervé both perished, along with more than 1,700 men, both French and English.
HMS Regent was a French 16 to 18-gun brig of 350 tons (bm) that the British captured at Genoa in 1814, the Royal Navy purchased in 1816 but then transferred to the Revenue service, and that was sold in 1824. She then became the Colombian government brig Victoria. 
 was a  launched in 1930 and sunk by a mine with the loss of all hands in 1943.

References

Royal Navy ship names